Presidential elections were held in Ukraine on 1 December 1991, the first direct presidential elections in the country's history. Leonid Kravchuk, the Chairman of the Verkhovna Rada and de facto acting president, ran as an independent candidate and was elected with 61.6% of the vote.

An independence referendum held on the same day saw 92 percent of voters voting to secede from the Soviet Union. All six presidential candidates supported independence and had campaigned for a "yes" vote in the referendum.

Results

By region

References

External links
 Chrystyna Lalpychak. INDEPENDENCE . The Ukrainian Weekly. December 8, 1991

Presidential election
Presidential elections in Ukraine
Ukraine
December 1991 events in Europe
Leonid Kravchuk